Matúš Holíček (born 25 January 2005) is a Slovakian professional footballer who plays as a midfielder for League Two club Crewe Alexandra.

Club career
A graduate of Crewe Alexandra's Academy, Holíček signed a professional contract in 2022 despite having only completed the first year of his scholarship, before he made his debut for the club as a second-year scholar in their EFL Trophy game against Leeds United U21s on 1 November 2022, playing the first 54 minutes before being replaced by Tariq Uwakwe.

On his 18th birthday (25 January 2023), Holíček signed a long-term deal through to summer 2025, with an option for two further years. On 18 March 2023, Holíček made his first league appearance for Crewe, coming on as a 77th minute substitute for Callum Ainley in the side's 1-0 League Two defeat at Northampton Town.

International career
After making seven appearances for Slovakia at Under-15 and eight appearances at Under-17 levels, Holíček was called up for their Under-18 squad for a friendly tournament, playing all three games against USA, Mexico and Finland on 21, 23 and 25 September 2022 respectively.

Career statistics

References

Living people
Slovak footballers
English Football League players
Crewe Alexandra F.C. players
2005 births
Association football midfielders